Peak fossil fuel may refer to:
 Peak fossil fuel production; see Hubbert peak theory#Hubbert curve.
 Peak coal.
 Peak gas.
 Peak oil.